Lambrocus Thomas (1610? - 1672) was a Welsh clergyman who served as Canon Chancellor and Dean of Chichester Cathedral.

Education
Thomas studied at the University of Franeker where he matriculated on 2 June 1641 and graduated, in divinity, on 4 October 1643. He was incorporated, on his doctors degree, at Cambridge University, in 1670.

Family
Lambrocus Thomas was married to Margaret Thomas alias Briggs. His wife outlived him and she was the executrix of his will.

Career
Vicar of Pevensey, Sussex 1642-1672
Chancellor of Chichester 1660-1672 
Dean of Chichester 1671-1672

Chichester
At the end of the 17th century the full number of Canons Residentiary, at Chichester Cathedral, was four. In 1661 when one of the Canons Residentiary (Nicholas Garbrand) resigned, he was not replaced. In 1663 Thomas, who by that time was chancellor, made the number of  residentiaries back up to four. When he eventually became Dean in 1671, he continued to hold the residentiary post. He was the last person, at Chichester, to hold the post of  Canon Residentiary and Dean simultaneously.

Monument
Lambrocus Thomas died 27 November 1672. Thomas Abingdon writing in 1717 recorded that a memorial plaque in black marble  had been attached to the north wall at the upper end of the Chichester Cathedral chancel. The original text was in Latin, an English translation follows:

Notes

References

Sources
 
 
 
 
 	
 
 
 
 

Deans of Chichester
1672 deaths
17th-century Welsh Anglican priests
Alumni of St John's College, Cambridge